Yosemitia didactica is a species of snout moth in the genus Yosemitia. It was described by Harrison Gray Dyar Jr. in 1915. It is found in southern Mexico.

References

Moths described in 1915
Phycitini